Flight 40 may refer to:

Mohawk Airlines Flight 40, crashed on 23 June 1967
Somali Airlines Flight 40, crashed on 20 July 1981

0040